Northumberland—Peterborough South is a federal electoral district in Ontario.

Northumberland—Peterborough South was created by the 2012 federal electoral boundaries redistribution and was legally defined in the 2013 representation order. It came into effect upon the call of the 42nd Canadian federal election, scheduled for 19 October 2015. 77% of the riding was formed from Northumberland—Quinte West, 13% from Durham and 10% from Peterborough.

The riding was originally intended to be named Northumberland—Pine Ridge.

Geography
The riding is located in Central Ontario along Lake Ontario. It contains the entirety of Northumberland County, southern Peterborough and the eastern half of the municipality of Clarington.

Demographics
According to the Canada 2011 Census; 2013 representation

Ethnic groups: 95.0% White, 2.5% Aboriginal 
Languages: 94.0% English, 1.6% French
Religions: 71.3% Christian (20.1% United Church, 19.4% Catholic, 12.8% Anglican, 4.0% Presbyterian, 2.8% Baptist, 1.6% Pentecostal, 1.2% Lutheran, 9.5% Other), 27.6% No religion 
Median income (2010): $30,350 
Average income (2010): $38,693

Members of Parliament

This riding has elected the following Members of Parliament:

Election results

References

Ontario federal electoral districts
Clarington
Cobourg
Politics of Peterborough, Ontario